Ospitaletto is a town and comune in the province of Brescia, in Lombardy.

Transport
 Ospitaletto-Travagliato railway station

References

Cities and towns in Lombardy